Gloria D. Brown (born 1959 in Montgomery, Alabama) is an American singer. Brown had a single called "The More They Knock, The More I Love You" in the UK singles charts. It was released on the 10 label, entered the chart on 8 June 1985, and rose to a high of number 57; it remained in the charts for 3 weeks.

Another single, "What Does It Take", was released on the Krystal label, and appeared in Billboard magazine's list of Hot Black Singles in August 1986, at number 69.

References 

1959 births
Living people
20th-century American women singers
American women pop singers
Musicians from Montgomery, Alabama
Singers from Alabama
20th-century American singers
21st-century American women